Acrolophus crescentella is a moth of the family Acrolophidae. It is found in North America, including Arizona.

References

Moths described in 1907
crescentella